Sisyphus (Spanish: Sísifo) is an oil painting by the Venetian master Titian, made in 1548 or 1549. It is in the collection of the Museo del Prado in Madrid.

Subject 

From Homer onwards Sisyphus was famed as the craftiest of men. In the underworld Sisyphus was compelled to roll a big stone up a steep hill; but before it reached the top of the hill the stone always rolled down, and Sisyphus had to begin all over again. The subject was a commonplace of ancient writers, and Titian's source was a passage in Ovid's Metamorphoses, which recounts the eternal sufferings of several personages in the underworld:

History 

On his first visit to Augsburg Titian received a new commission from Charles V's sister, Queen Mary of Hungary. Titian had to execute two or three large pictures, which should represent Tantalus, Sisyphus and Tityus. Two of them were painted in the first half of 1549; for they already adorned the Great Hall of the Summer Palace of Binche, for which the Queen evidently had destined them, in the August of the same year when Philip was her guest in the Low Countries. However, the last picture of this series, the Tityus, was not executed till much later, in about 1553.

The Queen took the collection of pictures (some by Titian and some by other hands) with her to Spain; in the sixteenth century they hung in the Alcázar at Madrid, and gave to the room its name, Pieza de las Furias, which may be translated "the room of the Forces". In course of time the Tantalus was lost, and the Tityus and Sisyphus, still remaining in the Prado, were once supposed, on the strength of ancient testimony, to be copies by the hand of Sánchez Coello. Georg Gronau writes, "If so Coello must have worked with the highest skill in imitation of Titian's style. The two pictures really display all the bold design, the touch, and the colouring of Titian, and should be reckoned among his finest original creations." Charles Ricketts says they are very properly ascribed to Titian instead of being described as copies by the "cold, bad colourist", Sánchez Coello.

Analysis 
Georg Gronau imagines the Pieza de las Furias as it must once have been:

Charles Ricketts describes the two surviving pictures by Titian:

Provenance 

 1700—Royal Collection (Royal Alcázar, Madrid), no. 3;
 1747–1818—New Royal Palace, Madrid, no. 32;
 1819–present—Museo del Prado, Madrid, no. P000426.

Gallery

See also 

 The Myth of Sisyphus

Notes

References

Sources 
 Falomir Faus, Miguel (2003). "Sisyphus". Museo Nacionel del Prado. Retrieved 21 August 2022.

Attribution:

1540s paintings
Paintings by Titian in the Museo del Prado
Mythological paintings by Titian
Paintings based on Metamorphoses